The 1943 Tschammerpokal Final decided the winner of the 1943 Tschammerpokal, the 9th season of Germany's knockout football cup competition. It was played on 31 August 1943 at the Adolf-Hitler-Kampfbahn in Stuttgart. First Vienna won the match 3–2 against LSV Hamburg after extra time, to claim their 1st cup title.

Route to the final
The Tschammerpokal began the final stage with 34 teams in a single-elimination knockout cup competition. There were a total of five rounds leading up to the final. In the qualification round, all but two teams were given a bye. Teams were drawn against each other, and the winner after 90 minutes would advance. If still tied, 30 minutes of extra time was played. If the score was still level, a replay would take place at the original away team's stadium. If still level after 90 minutes, 30 minutes of extra time was played. If the score was still level, a second replay would take place at the original home team's stadium. If still level after 90 minutes, 30 minutes of extra time was played. If the score was still level, a drawing of lots would decide who would advance to the next round.

Note: In all results below, the score of the finalist is given first (H: home; A: away).

Match

Details

References

External links
 Match report at kicker.de 
 Match report at WorldFootball.net
 Match report at Fussballdaten.de 

Luftwaffen-SV Hamburg matches
First Vienna FC matches
Tschammerpokal Final
1943
Sports competitions in Stuttgart
20th century in Stuttgart
August 1943 sports events